Harry Street (5 September 1927 – 29 September 2002) was an English professional rugby league footballer who played in the 1940s and 1950s, and coached in the 1950s, 1960s and 1970s.

Background
Harry Street was born in Castleford, West Riding of Yorkshire, England, and he died aged 75 in Huddersfield, West Yorkshire, England.

Playing career

International honours
Harry Street won caps for England while at Dewsbury in 1950 against Wales (2 matches), and France, while at Wigan in 1951 against France, in 1952 against Wales, in 1953 against France, and won caps for Great Britain while at Dewsbury in 1950 against Australia (3 matches), and New Zealand.

Only five players have played test matches for Great Britain as both a back, and a forward, they are; Colin Dixon, Frank Gallagher, Laurie Gilfedder, Billy Jarman, and Harry Street.

Championship final appearances
Harry Street played , in Wigan's 13-6 victory over Bradford Northern in the Championship Final during the 1951–52 season at Leeds Road, Huddersfield on Saturday 10 May 1952.

County League appearances
Harry Street played in Wigan's victory in the Lancashire County League during the 1951–52 season .

Challenge Cup Final appearances
Harry Street played , in Leeds' 9-7 victory over Barrow in the 1956–57 Challenge Cup Final during the 1956–57 season at Wembley Stadium, London on Saturday 11 May 1957, in front of a crowd of 76,318.

County Cup Final appearances
Harry Street played , in Wigan's 14-6 victory over Leigh in the 1951–52 Lancashire County Cup Final during the 1951–52 season at Station Road, Swinton on Saturday 27 October 1951, and played , and scored a try in the 8-16 defeat by St. Helens in the 1953–54 Lancashire County Cup Final during the 1953–54 season at Station Road, Swinton on Saturday 24 October 1953.

Notable tour matches
Harry Street played , and scored a try in Wigan's 8-15 defeat by New Zealand at Central Park, Wigan on Saturday 3 November 1951, and scored a try in the 13–23 defeat by Australia at Central Park, Wigan on Wednesday 24 September 1952.

Club career
On Thursday 20 January 1949, Harry Street was transferred from St. Helens to Dewsbury for £1,000 (based on increases in average earnings, this would be approximately £81,430 in 2013) along with Leonard Constance who was sold for £2,000, the £3,000 raised, contributed to the £4,000 St. Helens paid to Belle Vue Rangers for Stan McCormick, Harry Street made his début for Featherstone Rovers on Saturday 8 February 1958.

Coaching career

Club career
Harry Street was the coach of Castleford, his first game in charge was on Saturday 16 August 1958, and his last game in charge was on Monday 28 December 1964.

Genealogical information
Harry Street was the younger brother of the rugby league  for Dewsbury and Doncaster; Arthur Street (birth registered during fourth ¼ 1922 in Pontefract district).

References

External links
Statistics at saints.org.uk
Statistics at wigan.rlfans.com
Photograph "Diabira "bashed"" at rlhp.co.uk
Photograph "A "study" in expressions" at rlhp.co.uk
Photograph "Interval talk" at rlhp.co.uk
Photograph "Mick Lamb" at rlhp.co.uk

1927 births
2002 deaths
Bradford Bulls coaches
British Army personnel of World War II
Castleford Tigers coaches
Castleford Tigers players
Dewsbury Rams players
England national rugby league team players
English rugby league coaches
English rugby league players
Featherstone Rovers players
Great Britain national rugby league team players
Keighley Cougars coaches
Leeds Rhinos players
Rugby league centres
Rugby league locks
Rugby league players from Castleford
St Helens R.F.C. players
Wigan Warriors players
Yorkshire rugby league team players